Christian Aebersold (born 22 February 1962) is a Swiss orienteering competitor. He is three times Relay World Champion, as a member of the Swiss winning teams in 1991, 1993 and 1995. He is also a four time Swiss champion over the long distance (1986 to 1988, and 1990).

Aebersold is the father of Simona Aebersold.

References

External links

1962 births
Living people
Swiss orienteers
Male orienteers
Foot orienteers
World Orienteering Championships medalists
Swiss mountain runners
20th-century Swiss people